In mathematics, particularly in functional analysis and topology, closed graph is a property of functions. 
A function  between topological spaces has a closed graph if its graph is a closed subset of the product space . 
A related property is open graph.

This property is studied because there are many theorems, known as closed graph theorems, giving conditions under which a function with a closed graph is necessarily continuous.  One particularly well-known class of closed graph theorems are the closed graph theorems in functional analysis.

Definitions

Graphs and set-valued functions 

Definition and notation: The graph of a function  is the set 
. 

 Some authors call a function  a set-valued function only if it satisfies the additional requirement that  is not empty for every ; this article does not require this. 

. 

Note that in this case, .

Open and closed graph 

We give the more general definition of when a -valued function or set-valued function defined on a subset  of  has a closed graph since this generality is needed in the study of closed linear operators that are defined on a dense subspace  of a topological vector space  (and not necessarily defined on all of ). 
This particular case is one of the main reasons why functions with closed graphs are studied in functional analysis. 

If  or if  is clear from context then we may omit writing "in "

Closable maps and closures 

Closed maps and closed linear operators 

Definition and notation: When we write  then we mean that  is a -valued function with domain  where .

When reading literature in functional analysis, if  is a linear map between topological vector spaces (TVSs) (e.g. Banach spaces) then " is closed" will almost always means the following: 

In particular, the term "closed linear operator" will almost certainly refer to a linear map whose graph is closed. 

Otherwise, especially in literature about point-set topology, " is closed" may instead mean the following:

These two definitions of "closed map" are not equivalent. 
If it is unclear, then it is recommended that a reader check how "closed map" is defined by the literature they are reading.

Characterizations 

Throughout, let  and  be topological spaces. 

Function with a closed graph

If  is a function then the following are equivalent:

   has a closed graph (in );

and if  is a Hausdorff compact space then we may add to this list: 
  is continuous;

  has a sequentially closed graph (in );

Function with a sequentially closed graph

If  is a function then the following are equivalent:
   has a sequentially closed graph (in );

set-valued function with a closed graph

If  is a set-valued function between topological spaces  and  then the following are equivalent:
   has a closed graph (in );

and if  is compact and Hausdorff then we may add to this list: 

Sufficient conditions for a closed graph 

 Note that if  is a function between Hausdorff topological spaces then it is possible for   to have a closed graph in  but not be continuous.

Closed graph theorems: When a closed graph implies continuity 

Conditions that guarantee that a function with a closed graph is necessarily continuous are called closed graph theorems. 
Closed graph theorems are of particular interest in functional analysis where there are many theorems giving conditions under which a linear map with a closed graph is necessarily continuous. 

Examples

Continuous but not closed maps 

 If  is any space then the identity map  is continuous but its graph, which is the diagonal , is closed in  if and only if  is Hausdorff. In particular, if  is not Hausdorff then  is continuous but not closed.
 If  is a continuous map whose graph is not closed then  is not a Hausdorff space.

Closed but not continuous maps 

 Let  and  both denote the real numbers  with the usual Euclidean topology. Then  has a closed graph (and a sequentially closed graph) in  but it is not continuous (since it has a discontinuity at ).
 Let  denote the real numbers  with the usual Euclidean topology, let  denote  with the discrete topology, and let  be the identity map (i.e.  for every ). Then  is a linear map whose graph is closed in  but it is clearly not continuous (since singleton sets are open in  but not in ).
Then the identity map  a closed discontinuous linear operator.

Closed linear operators 

Every continuous linear operator valued in a Hausdorff topological vector space (TVS) has a closed graph and recall that a linear operator between two normed spaces is continuous if and only if it is bounded. 

Closed graph theorem 

Basic properties 

The following properties are easily checked for a linear operator  between Banach spaces:

 If  is closed and injective then its inverse  is also closed;

Example 

Consider the derivative operator  where  is the Banach space of all continuous functions on an interval . 
If one takes its domain  to be , then  is a closed operator, which is not bounded. 

See also

References 

  
  
  
  
  
  
  
  
  
  

Functional analysis